Guerilla Toss is an American rock band, formed in Boston in 2012. Now based in New York City,
the group currently consists of singer Kassie Carlson, drummer Peter Negroponte, guitarist Arian Shafiee, keyboardist Sam Lisabeth, and bassist Zach Lewellyn. Guerilla Toss has released five studio albums, seven EPs, and three remix albums, on various underground labels, DFA Records and more recently on Sub Pop. They were listed in Rolling Stone magazine as one of the "10 Great Modern Punk Bands" and Henry Rollins has called them "one of the first great bands of the new century".

History

Formation and early years (2012–2014) 
Guerilla Toss’ members consider the band to have truly started when singer Kassie Carlson joined in 2012. Carlson first met Guerilla Toss when her former hardcore band, Western Syndrome, performed with the group at a house show.
 

Guerilla Toss toured extensively, nationally, and within Boston's DIY community by performing at many show houses such as Gay Gardens, where Carlson and Negroponte were both residents on separate occasions. Later that year Guerilla Toss released Jeffrey Johnson, through Feeding Tube Records.
 
In May 2013, Guerilla Toss released an EP, GTOSS, through Tzadik Records, the record label owned by avant-garde composer John Zorn. The group then released an EP later that year—Kicked Back into the Crypt, a split LP with noise rock band The Sediment Club that was co-released through Sophomore Lounge Records and Feeding Tube Records

Guerilla Toss began to incorporate disco and funk elements into their sound as shown with the release of their debut LP Gay Disco through NNA Tapes in December 2013.
In July 2014, they released their next EP, 367 Equalizer, through Infinity Cat Recordings.

Towards the end of 2014 the band released the EP, Smack The Brick, through NNA Tapes. Guerilla Toss wrapped up the year by going on a US / Europe tour that included the fourth-to-last show at New York City warehouse venue Death By Audio with Thee Oh Sees.

Signing to DFA Eraser Stargazer, GT Ultra, Twisted Crystal (2015–2019) 

Guerilla Toss relocated to New York City during the summer of 2015. 

On June 24, 2015, Guerilla Toss opened for seminal Boston post-punk band Mission Of Burma in Portsmouth, New Hampshire. The band's leader, Roger Miller is a self proclaimed fan. 
 
Adding to Guerilla Toss’ growing popularity, Kris Petersen and Jonathan Galkin of DFA Records, the record label co-founded by James Murphy of LCD Soundsystem, signed Guerilla Toss to the label. The band's first release through them was the EP Flood Dosed in October 2015, which was met with some acclaim.

Around this time, the band began varying their setlists and jamming during their live performances in addition to encouraging tapers to come and check out their shows, citing the Grateful Dead as an inspiration.
 
In March 2016, Guerilla Toss released their album Eraser Stargazer through DFA Records. Eraser Stargazer was recorded during the winter of 2015 in Livingston Manor, NY.
 
Guerilla Toss released two more recordings in 2016. One of them was a remix EP of Eraser Stargazer by Giant Claw—who did the artwork for Eraser Stargazer, Live in Nashville, and Gay Disco—titled Giant Claw vs. Guerilla Toss, which was released in May 2016 through DFA Records. The other release was their first live album, Live in Nashville, which was recorded at The End in Nashville, TN on March 11, 2016, during the Eraser Stargazer tour. The album was released in June 2016 on vinyl via Feeding Tube Records and digitally via DFA Records.

In June 2017, Guerilla Toss released GT ULTRA, their second full-length album release on DFA Records. The LP received positive reviews. Popular YouTuber and music critic Anthony Fantano gave the album an 8/10, saying "Thanks to some clearer production, more up-front performances, and a zany new wave influence, GT ULTRA is the most I've ever enjoyed a Guerilla Toss album" and included it on his "Loved List: 2017" 

On July 18, 2018, the band released a music video for the song "Meteorological", alongside an announcement on their official Facebook page. The video was produced by giraffestudio and directed by Nicky "Giraffe" and Juliana "Giraffe". Carlson was also part of the video editing process. On the official announcement, that was released alongside an article on Stereogum, where their sixth full-length album, Twisted Crystal, was announced. The album was  released on September 14, 2018, with artwork made by Jacob van Loon. 

An EP titled What Would The Odd Do? was released on NNA Tapes October 18, 2019. The band continued to tour, opening for Battles in Toronto, Chicago, Brooklyn, and Boston in December of 2019

Signing to Sub Pop, Famously Alive (2022) 

 On June 15, 2020, the band released 2 songs as part of the Sub Pop 7" club, "Human Girl" and "Own Zone" 

In January 2022, Guerilla Toss announced that they had signed to Sub Pop, and released their next album, Famously Alive, through the label on March 25, 2022. They released the album's first single, "Cannibal Capital", on January 12, 2022. The LP received positive reviews. Nick Forté, of the seminal hardcore punk band Rorschach, is credited as co-writing two songs on the album. 

Shortly after Famously Alive was released, Stephen Malkmus, who had seen the band perform in 2019, personally asked Guerilla Toss to open for his band Pavement on their 2022 reunion tour. It was announced in May that they would open in San Francisco, Troutdale, and Seattle. They were later added to the Toronto and Boston Pavement shows as well.

In July 2022, Guerilla Toss released the single "Zum Herz" on the official tribute album to Neu!, through Grönland Records.

On October 28th, 2022, Guerilla Toss released the single "Heathen Money" on a compilation called "The Eleventh Hour: Songs For Climate Justice", curated by Sub Pop and film director Adam McKay. All of the proceeds from the compilation go to the Climate Emergency Fund.

Guerilla Toss toured extensively throughout the year, playing festivals such as Pickathon, Pitchfork Berlin and Paris, and the Primavera Weekender

Artistry

Musical style
Guerilla Toss's earlier work has been labeled as art rock, no wave, noise rock, and punk, namely for their odd time signatures and dissonant instrumentals. Throughout their DFA years, critics noted the addition of psych, krautrock, new wave, funk and dance music elements to the bands sound, often being compared to artists like Talking Heads, The B-52's, Boredoms, Brian Eno, and Grace Jones. Carlson's vocal style has been compared to that of Lizzy Mercier Descloux, Laurie Anderson, and Kathleen Hanna.

Influences

Early on in their career, Guerilla Toss considered no wave artists like James Chance and Lydia Lunch,  experimental artists like Captain Beefheart, and avant-garde composers like György Ligeti and John Zorn, to be major influences. They have cited artists such as Charli XCX, Andy Stott, Caroline Polachek, Arca, Arthur Russell, and Boards Of Canada as recent influences. With 2022's "Famously Alive" release, the band dubbed their current sound as "Hyper Punk" (a play on the genre of Hyperpop), fusing elements of pop and electronic music into their sound with a maximalist approach. Carlson's older brother is singer Jonah Jenkins of Only Living Witness and Milligram, as well as several other Boston based underground punk and hardcore bands throughout the 90's. He currently sings in the sludge metal / crust punk band Raw Radar War. She grew up watching her brother perform and has stated in several interviews that she considers him an early influence in her development as a musician. Several members of Guerilla Toss are avid fans of The Grateful Dead. Carlson is a DJ for WJFF Radio Catskill and curates a weekly show called Rare Pear Radio, featuring fringe music mostly by queer and female artists.

Lyrical themes

Carlson's lyrics often deal with subject matter such as substance abuse and recovery, growing up in poverty, religious fanaticism, the psychedelic experience, mental illness, technology, climate change, self motivation, depression and alien abduction.
Carlson has said she draws inspiration from multitudes of subjects including contemporary literature like that of Milan Kundera, existentialist literature like that of Hermann Hesse, and cognitive science.

Members 

Current
 Kassie Carlson – vocals/violin (2012–present)
 Peter Negroponte – drums (2012–present)
 Arian Shafiee – guitar (2012–present)
 Sam Lisabeth – keyboards (2015–present)
 Zach Lewelleyn - bass  (2022–present)
 William Dantzler – visuals
 Matthew Mann - visuals (2022 Spring Tour)
 Watley – dog

Former
 Simon Hanes - bass (2012-2014)
 Ian Kovac - keyboards (2012-2014)
 Toby Aronson - keyboards (2014)
 Pat Keuhn - bass (2014)
 Phil Racz - bass (2015)
 Ben Katzman - bass (2015)
 Greg Albert - bass (2016-2018)
 Stephe Cooper – bass (2018-2021)

Timeline

Discography 

Studio albums
 Gay Disco (2013)
 Eraser Stargazer (2016)
 GT Ultra (2017)
 Twisted Crystal (2018)
 Famously Alive (2022)
 
EPs
 Jeffery Johnson (2012)
 Kicked Back into the Crypt (2013)
 GTOSS (2013)
 367 Equalizer (2014)
 Smack the Brick (2014)
 Flood Dosed (2015)
 What Would The Odd Do? (2019)
 
Live albums
 Live in Nashville (2016)
 
Singles
 "Human Girl"/"Own Zone" (2020)

Remixes
 Giant Claw – "Giant Claw vs. Guerilla Toss" (2016)
 Jay Glass Dubs – "Jay Glass Dubs vs Guerilla Toss" (2017)
 Khotin and Yu Su – "Retwisted Crystal" (2019)
 
Music videos
 "367 Equalizer" (2014)
 "Doll Face on the Calico Highway" (2016)
 "Perfume" (2016)
 "Color Picture" (2016)
 "The String Game" (2017)
 "Skull Pop" (2017)
 "Betty Dreams of Green Men" (2017)
 "Dose Rate" (2018)
 "Meteorological" (2018)
 "Plants" (2019)
 "Cannibal Capital" (2022)

References

Musical groups from Boston
Rock music groups from Massachusetts
2012 establishments in Massachusetts
DFA Records artists